Aguamarina, is a 1997 American telenovela produced by Telemundo. Was led by Ruddy Rodríguez and Leonardo García with antagonistic action of Mara Croatto.

Cast 

 Ruddy Rodríguez as Marina Luna / Aguamarina
 Leonardo García as Diego Quintana
 Mara Croatto as Verona Calatrava
 Fernando Carrera as Ricardo Calatrava
 Zully Montero as Dona Augusta de Calatrava
 Oswaldo Calvo as Don Julio
 Norma Zuñiga as Renata
 Hans Christopher as Watusi
 Denise Novell as Celeste
 Mario Martin as Silverio
 Griselda Noguera as Germanica
 Eduardo Ibarrola as Schwarzenegger
 Marcela Cardona as Pilar
 Lino Ferrer as Giorgio
 Marisol Calero as Penélope
 Alexandra Navarro as Danielita
 Martha Picanes as Patricia Barbosa
 Cristian de la Osa as Juanito

References

External links 
 

Telemundo telenovelas
1997 telenovelas